Big Shots is a studio album by American hip hop duo Charizma & Peanut Butter Wolf. Recorded between 1991 and 1993 for Hollywood BASIC, it was released on Stones Throw Records in 2003, 10 years after Charizma's death. It peaked at number 2 on CMJ's Hip-Hop chart, as well as number 27 on the CMJ Radio 200 chart. The first single from the album, titled "My World Premiere", was originally released in 1996.

Critical reception

Sam Samuelson of AllMusic gave the album 3 stars out of 5, calling it "a treasure that should be cherished by hip-hop fans the world over." Todd Inoue of Metro Silicon Valley said, "Charizma sounds like MC Shan blessed with youthful lung capacity while PB Wolf makes like Marley Marl programming beats in DJ Premier's lab." Ross Hogg of XLR8R said, "Charizma's voice brims with eagerness, enthusiasm and earnestness; Wolf's textured, jazzy beats epitomize boom bap and are a sign of great things to come."

Nathan Rabin of The A.V. Club said, "while Big Shots is one of those charmed debuts where nearly every song sounds like a terrific single, it wouldn't be without Wolf, whose gorgeously constructed tracks, flawless ear for melody, and extensive sonic quotations anticipate Madlib." Rachel Swan of East Bay Express said, "had Charizma not been shot and killed in '93, he might've turned into another Pharoahe Monch or J-Live."

In 2003, East Bay Express included it on the "Best Music of the East Bay" list. In 2007, The A.V. Club included it on the "10 Unjustly Overlooked Hip-Hop Classics" list.

Track listing

Personnel
Credits adapted from the CD liner notes.

 Charizma – vocals
 Peanut Butter Wolf – production, executive production
 Peter Stanley – recording
 Dave Cooley – mastering
 Jeff Jank – design, photography
 Theresa Castro – photography
 Egon – label management

References

Further reading

External links
 

2003 debut albums
Stones Throw Records albums
Peanut Butter Wolf albums
Albums published posthumously